The Al-Huda Mosque is a mosque in Bukit Timah, Singapore, located at Jalan Haji Alias, off Sixth Avenue.

See also
Islam in Singapore
List of mosques in Singapore

References

External links
Official website of Masjid Al-Huda
Masjid Al-Huda on the Majlis Ugama Islam Singapura (MUIS) website

 

1966 establishments in Singapore
Bukit Timah
Huda
Mosques completed in 1966
20th-century architecture in Singapore